Chairman of the New Jersey Republican State Committee:

1880–1891: Garret Augustus Hobart
1891–1892: John Kean
1892–1904: Franklin Murphy
1904–1907: Frank Obadiah Briggs
1907–1910: Franklin Murphy
1910–1913: Frank Obadiah Briggs
1913–1919: Newton Albert Kendall Bugbee
1919–1927: Edward C. Stokes
1927–1934: Elias Bertram Mott
1934–1935: E. Donald Sterner 
1935–1937: Henry W. Jeffers  
1937–1941: Clayton E. Freeman
1941–1943: Howard Alexander Smith 
1943–1949: Lloyd B. Marsh
1949–1953: John J. Dickerson  
1953–1958: Samuel L. Bodine 
1958–1961: Charles R. Erdman, Jr.
1961–1969: Webster B. Todd 
1969–1970: Nelson G. Gross
1970–1973: John E. Dimon 
1973: John J. Spoltore
1974–1976: Webster B. Todd
1977–1980: David A. Norcross 
1981–1985: Philip D. Kaltenbacher 
1985–1987: Frank B. Holman
1987–1989: Bob Franks
1989–1990: Kathleen Donovan
1990–1992: Bob Franks
1992–1995: Virginia Littell
1995–2001: Chuck Haytaian
2001–2004: Joseph M. Kyrillos
2004–2009: Tom Wilson
2009–2011: Jay Webber
2011–2017: Sam Raia
2017–2017: Michael B. Lavery
2017–2020: Doug Steinhardt
2020–2021: Michael B. Lavery
2021-present: Bob Hugin

References